Rick and Morty – The Rickoning is a graphic novel, written by Kyle Starks and illustrated by Marc Ellerby, which was released in five parts throughout 2019 and 2020 by Oni Press, as the twelfth and final volume of the first comic series based on the television series of the same name by Justin Roiland and Dan Harmon. Part One was released on November 27, 2019, Part Two was released on December 18, 2019, Part Three was released on January 29, 2020, Part Four was released on February 26, 2020, and Part Five was released on March 25, 2020. The volume's backup stories were written by Terry Blas and illustrated by Benjamin Dewey.

A metafictional direct sequel to the "Pilot" and the comic arcs The Ricky Horror Peacock Show and Rick Revenge Squad (with the Doctor Who-inspired Peacock Jones returning as the secondary antagonist), in a twist ending, The Rickoning is revealed to follow a different Rick and Morty than Rick Sanchez C-137 and Morty Smith Prime (whom the comic series had revolved around since Head-Space), who are killed at the conclusion of the storyline. It is followed by the limited series Rick and Morty Go to Hell, following the Rick and Morty of The Rickoning as they and the rest of the universe descend into Hell after their deaths. Following a succession of additional limited series (and 100th issue overall), a new ongoing Rick and Morty comic series (again following Rick C-137 and Morty Prime) began publication in January 2023.

The series is notable for introducing a female version of Rick Sanchez (Rule 63 Cosplay Rick) designed after cosplayer Santana Maynard, and featuring series creators Justin Roiland & Dan Harmon and writer/illustrator team Kyle Starks & Marc Ellerby in illustrative cameo roles; receiving a positive critical reception.

Premise

Part One
In an alternate reality sometime after the events of Rick Revenge Squad, while on the run from Party Dog's empire (who blame him for their boss' death), and drinking at a bar, mourning Mr. Sick, Peacock Jones is advised by a hooded figure that separating Rick from Morty (and acquiring more intelligence) will leave the former vulnerable. Elsewhere, after several unsatisfactory adventures, Morty cashes in his tenth mission ticket, and the two leave to visit Brick and Mortary, an interdimensional superstore run by self-titled alternate versions of themselves, while Jones breaks into their garage, stealing numerous of Rick's gadgets. At the store, Morty is convinced to buy the Hollaluog, an all-powerful impregnable armored suit and the "greatest weapon of war ever devised", which Rick reluctantly pays for. On getting home, Morty dons the Hollaluog and goes on a series of adventures with Rick over the ensuing months, eventually leading Rick growing bored of adventures in general. On learning of this, Morty offers to give up the Hollaluog, only for Rick to heavily insult his intelligence for doing so; in response, Morty takes his portal gun and goes without the Hollaluog to Dimension 35-C from the "Pilot" in search of Mega-Seeds to increase his intelligence, only to be met at gunpoint by a waiting Jones. Elsewhere, the hooded figure who advised Jones is revealed member of the IllumiRicki, a cabal of Ricks seeking to purge the multiverse of rogue Ricks.

Part Two
Searching for Morty with his spare portal gun, Rick discovers him to have been kidnapped by Peacock Jones, who has taken Rick's portal gun and all of the Mega-Seeds to become a superintelligence. After recruiting Jerry to help him (to hide his presence from Jones via his "Jerry-Waves"), the two follow Jones to SchwiftyCon, a convention in an alternate reality where Rick and Morty is a popular fictional multimedia franchise, with Rick ending up in a fistfight with Jones, and Justin Roiland and Dan Harmon being crushed by a giant Pickle Rick model during the process. After Rick and Jerry lose track of Jones, the reality's native female Rick (based on Santana Maynard) holds opens Jones' portal long enough for the duo to follow after him, finding it to lead to where Jones' ship (which is bigger on the inside) is stored, and realising that they're being lead into a trap.

Part Three
Recruiting and the Jaguar and the Ball Fondlers to their cause, Rick and Jerry invade Peacock Jones' ship to rescue Morty, fighting off an army of robots and Mr. Meeseeks, only to find Jones dead, killed by Beth and Summer (whom Jones had also kidnapped via Meeseeks while Rick and Jerry were gone). After the Smith family return home, Jaguar and the Ball Fondlers learn that Morty has been brainwashed to kill Rick, while in his home reality, Morty stares with intent at the Hollaluog.

Part Four
As the IllumiRicki purchase a universe-destroying bomb and a portal-blocking generator (which blocks one from opening a portal from a universe, but not to it; with a built-in five-second delay) from Brick and Mortary, the narrator of The Rickoning (Mr. Poopybutthole) flees, and Morty dons the Hollaluog armor and attempts to kill Rick, using the armor's built-in portal abilities to avoid Rick's evasive tactics and attempts to kill him, before beginning to beat him to a pulp. However, after Rick frees Morty of his brainwashing through a vision of Jessica, Morty decides to continue trying to kill Rick anyway, sick of how "expendable" he views the family, and how he had tried to kill him first before even trying to un-brainwash him. As their fight devolves into repeatedly slapping one another, Beth talks them into considering being considerate of each other's feelings, as the IllumiRicki's bomb (with attached portal-blocker) drops into the garage.

Part Five
Fleeing the reality with Morty in the five seconds before the portal-blocker activates, Rick proceeds to find and kill all but one member of the IllumiRicki, a group he himself (the "Worst Rick") had founded years earlier before forgetting to look out for. After being told only "Rick's heart" would turn off the bomb, Rick returns with Morty to their reality to deactivate the bomb, which will not explode foor a further three hours (due to the Rick who created it wanting those watching "to really suffer mentally before [their] existence was snuffed out"). As Rick works on attempting to deactivate the bomb, Summer, Beth, and Jerry proceed to live out their last hours of existence in case Rick's fails: Summer taking Rick's ray gun and vaporising everyone she hates, Beth going to work to save another horse, and Jerry confronting Beth at work and redeclaring his love for her, with the two then having sex on top of Beth's horse patient. Meanwhile, Rick clones another Rick and uses his heart to attempt to stop the bomb, only for it to not deactivate. After Morty speculates the phrase "Rick's heart" may refer to love, Rick admits that he genuinely cares about this specific version of the Smith family, that he became the Worst Rick because he got "attached", only for the bomb to explode anyway and destroy their universe. In another universe, the IllumiRicki's apparent assistants, in fact the true masterminds behind the "puppet" group (lead by "Doofus" Rick from "Close Rick-counters of the Rick Kind" and A Tale of Two Jerries), celebrate their victory, before setting their sights on the Rick who destroyed the Council of Ricks, "just the next universe over from the last one": Rick C-137.

Backup stories
In "Bitty Crittys", as Morty, Summer, and Beth play the Pokémon Go-inspired augmented reality (AR) mobile game Bitty Crittys, they convince Rick to make real versions of the game's Bitty Crittys for them to care for (using his device to turn fictional beings real), only for Rick to unwittingly set them to transform to their final forms (and therefore breed) too quickly, leaving the family facing off against an army of Bitty Crittys, all also about to transform.

In "Blubber", while on a "mini-adventure" with Rick, flying through a swarm of space krill in space en-route to catching a Vuleen space whale to get its space blubber to turn into oil, Morty finds Summer in the backseat of the car (having been quietly texting there), and is surprised to learn that she is okay with the situation, actively encouraging Rick to shoot the whale. After Rick does so, Morty and Summer to dismayed to learn it is their job to collect the blubber, donning spacesuits to do so while Rick lounges in the car.

In "Baby Don't Hurt Me", After being challenged by Rick to make "a winged, alien centaur dude [with] a dinosaur body where the horse should be and plant appendages [who] love you unconditionally of its own free will", lest he (Rick) not be able to drink for a week, Rick creates such a being, named Julio, only for Morty to point out that if he programmed its brain to love him unconditionally, that by definition he doesn't, with Summer then declaring that Morty has one the bet. A few days later, Rick informs Morty that he banished Julio to a "monster-infested hell world" (in-fact a utopian nature setting filled with cuddly animals) to spite him, while in the world, an ever-loving Julio sheds a tear over Rick. The title is a reference to the 1993 Eurodance/dance-pop song "What Is Love (Baby Don't Hurt Me)" by Haddaway.

In "Likes and Follows", Summer calls Rick to school to get revenge of the school's "A-Group" for posting a picture of her from when she fell asleep in class online, which has become popular under the hashtag "#DroolKween". While initially refusing, lecturing her on the dangers of social media, Rick changes his mind after the A-Group insult him, and turns them into monsters with a purple ray gun, and Summer takes photos of the girls and posts them online under the hashtags "#BasicBeast" and "#MeanGirlMonster". However, instead of being ostracised, the girls instead find their follower count increase into the millions, becoming internet famous and receiving offers to do sponsored posts. Deciding to "give up", Summer gives a satisfied Rick her phone, who declares she is free, while Mr. Goldenfold demands that everyone go back to class.

In "Attack the Virus", sick of how Jerry is acting while sick with COVID-19, Rick extracts the virus from him and places it into a "little golem", only for it to mutate into a sentient virus person and infect an oblivious Morty with itself. As Jerry attempts to help Morty pull the virus out of him, he is infected again, and a frustrated Rick leaves to get his hazmat suit. The title is a reference to the 2011 British science fiction comedy horror film Attack the Block.

Development
In September 2019, series' writer Kyle Starks confirmed that the storyline started with Rick and Morty #56, The Rickoning, would serve as a conclusion to the Oni Press Rick and Morty comic book series started in 2015, on its conclusion in March 2020. Described as a whole by Starks as "one connected, wonderful arc" and "a sweet, sweet goodbye[…] a VERY good Rick and Morty story I'm very proud of.", series' artist Marc Ellerby described the second chapter of the arc as "without any doubt the best R&M issue I've ever drawn".

Follow-ups

Sequel

In April 2020, following the conclusion of the first ongoing Rick and Morty comic book series with The Rickoning, Oni Press began the publication of a five-issue limited series serving as an epilogue sequel to The Rickoning, titled Rick and Morty Go to Hell. Written by Ryan Ferrier and illustrated by Constanza Oroza, the series follows the Rick and Morty (C-136) of The Rickoning as they and the rest of the universe descend into Hell after their deaths from the Council of Doofus Ricks' universe-destroying bomb; as the wider Smith family explore the realm, Summer attempts to find true love, Jerry unwittingly inspires a revolution, and Rick remains in denial as Morty attempts to make a deal with the current Devil, Lucifer Morningstar / Lucius Needful.

Revival

Following a succession of limited series published by Oni Press over the next two years following the conclusion of the ongoing Rick and Morty comic book series, along with the spin-off series Rick and Morty Presents, a new ongoing series was announced in October 2022, to begin publication in January 2023. Written by Alex Firer, with Marc Ellerby returning as illustrator, the series would primarily follow the adventures of Rick C-137 and Morty Prime.

Reception

Collected editions

References

2019 graphic novels
2020 graphic novels
Rickoning, The
Oni Press titles
Sequel comics
Metafictional comics
Novels about the Illuminati
Comics based on Doctor Who
Works based on Pokémon